Connie Hines (March 24, 1931 – December 18, 2009) was an American actress best known for playing Alan Young's wife, Carol Post, on the 1960s sitcom Mister Ed.

Biography 
Hines was one of four children born in Dedham in Norfolk County, Massachusetts, to an actress mother and a Boston-based teacher/acting coach father. As a child, she appeared in many of her father's stock-company plays. A member of the class of 1948 at Dedham High School, she was voted the most popular girl in her class. She dated the captain of the football team and was class secretary. She tried out unsuccessfully for a part in the senior class play.

After her father's death, Hines married an insurance agent and moved to Jacksonville, Florida. She worked as a model and as a radio and stage actress there, with her own programs on WMBR-TV, and joined a stock company in Miami. By the time she was divorced, Hines traveled to New York City to study with the Helen Hayes Equity Group. When she came to Hollywood, she lived in an apartment, rented a car and began acting with a role on an episode of the syndicated television series Whirlybirds. Hines' first film role was in 1960's Thunder in Carolina. She also appeared in 1960 episodes of Sea Hunt and M Squad.

Hines made a guest appearance on the CBS western series Johnny Ringo as Lily in the episode "The Assassins." She also guested on an episode of Bachelor Father and made two guest appearances on Perry Mason. In 1960 she played defendant Lucy Stevens in "The Case of the Singular Double," then later played Sandra Dalgran, the wife of a murder victim, in a 1962 episode, "The Case of the Counterfeit Crank."

Hines was cast as Lucy Bridges in the 1960 episode "Chicota Landing" of the Darren McGavin NBC western series Riverboat, along with Richard Chamberlain as a United States Army lieutenant.

Mister Ed 
Hines auditioned for and won the role of Wilbur Post's wife Carol on Mister Ed, which was perhaps her best-known character. Hines considered the job "a tough chore," as the storylines focused more on the relationship of Wilbur (Alan Young) and Mister Ed (the talking horse) than her. Around the same time, she took some acting, dancing and music classes. She continued on Mister Ed until the series ended in 1966, then took guest parts on television shows such as Bonanza and The Mod Squad before she retired in 1971.

Young and Hines performed together in 1996 in Irvine, California, in the two-person play Love Letters, which deals with the correspondence of a man and woman over fifty years.

Personal 
A divorcée, Hines was remarried in 1970 to Lee Savin, an entertainment lawyer and producer. They remained together until Savin's death in 1995.

Death 
Hines died from heart problems on December 18, 2009, at her home in Beverly Hills, California.

References

External links

 
 
 Appearance on Dotto before she found fame

1931 births
2009 deaths
Actresses from Massachusetts
American film actresses
American television actresses
20th-century American actresses
People from Dedham, Massachusetts
People from Greater Los Angeles
Dedham High School alumni
21st-century American women